Bill 167 may refer to:

Canada
 Equality Rights Statute Amendment Act, an Ontario bill in 1994 which would have extended some rights of marriage to same-sex couples
 Ontario Toxics Reduction Act (2009)
 Saskatchewan Grain Car Corporation Amendment Act (2011)

United States
 the city charter which created the city of Cape Canaveral, Florida (1961)